Terry Branstad (born 1946) is an Iowa politician, university administrator, and diplomat. Branstad may also refer to:

Christine Branstad, former First Lady of Iowa, wife of Terry Branstad
Clifford Branstad (1924–2014), served in the Iowa House of Representatives, second cousin of Terry Branstad
Eric Branstad, American lobbyist, son of Terry Branstad
Puerto Rico v. Branstad, a 1987 extradition case decided by the Supreme Court of the United States
Branstad, Wisconsin, an unincorporated community in the town of Grantsburg, Burnett County